The Great Redeemer is a 1920 American silent Western film co-directed by Maurice Tourneur and Clarence Brown and starring House Peters, Marjorie Daw, Jack McDonald, and Joseph Singleton.

Cast
 House Peters as Dan Malloy 
 Marjorie Daw as The Girl 
 Jack McDonald as The Sheirff 
 Joseph Singleton as The Murderer
 John Gilbert (Undetermined Role (uncredited))

Production
This film was the first ever to be directed by producer and director Clarence Brown. It is not known whether the film currently survives.

References

External links

 
 

1920 films
1920 Western (genre) films
1920 directorial debut films
American black-and-white films
Films directed by Clarence Brown
Metro Pictures films
Silent American Western (genre) films
1920s American films